Ričardas Berankis and Teymuraz Gabashvili were the defending champions, but Berankis chose not to compete this year and Gabashvilli chose to participate in Marrakesh instead.
Bob and Mike Bryan won the title, defeating Víctor Estrella Burgos and Santiago González in the final, 4–6, 6–3, [10–8].

Seeds

Draw

Draw

References
Main draw

Doubles